Cody Jay Canada (born May 25, 1976) is an American rock/alt-country musician who currently is the lead singer and lead guitarist of the rock band The Departed since 2010. From 1994 to 2010, Canada was the lead singer of rock/alt country band Cross Canadian Ragweed.

Early life
Canada was born in Pampa, TX in 1976. He acquired a taste for music after attending a George Strait concert with his parents at the age of four. The next day he asked for a guitar.  Canada first started playing guitar at the age of eight. While Cody was a teen, the Canada family relocated to Yukon, Oklahoma and as a teenager was drawn to rock bands such as Nirvana and Pearl Jam and also outlaw country.

Cross Canadian Ragweed

In 1994, Canada along with fellow musicians Matt Weidemann (bass), Grady Cross (guitar), and Randy Ragsdale (percussion) formed Cross Canadian Ragweed in Yukon, Oklahoma. The band was named after the original members with Canada taking on the role of lead guitarist, lead vocals, and prominent songwriter. They would later move to Stillwater, Oklahoma. From the time of Ragweed's formation until its end in 2010, the band released seven studio albums as well as three live albums.

In 2010, the band went on an extended hiatus due to slight tensions inside the band, and Ragsdale's family responsibilities, eventually breaking up in late 2010.

The Departed

In 2011, Canada and Plato formed a new band, initially called Cody Canada & the Departed. The band originally consisted of Canada (guitar/vocals), Plato (bass guitar/vocals), Seth James (guitar/vocals), Steve Littleton (keyboards) and Chris Doege (drums) who replaced original drummer, Dave Bowen. They released their first album in June 2011 titled This Is Indian Land, consisting of covers written by Oklahoma songwriters.

On August 24, 2012, the band, now billing themselves as The Departed, announced through their website and social media that they would release their first original album titled Adventus. The album was released on November 13, 2012.

In September 2012, the band announced that they would release one song from Adventus every Monday leading up until the album's release on their Facebook artist profile.

In 2014 the band announced a third studio album.  Hippielovepunk was released on January 13, 2015.  The album debut at No. 9 on the Billboard US Country chart as well as No. 9 on the US Indie chart.  The first single was a return to the Red Dirt sound of CCR titled Inbetweener.

Solo work and collaborations
On November 19, 2013, Cody Canada released a solo acoustic 2-disc album Some Old, Some New, Maybe a Cover or Two.  The album was recorded live at Third Coast Music in Port Aransas, Texas, with 19 songs from throughout Canada's career, including works with Cross Canadian Ragweed and The Departed.

On November 13, 2015, Cody Canada released a two-disc, 35-track album with Mike McClure, Chip and Ray, Together Again for the First Time.  The album was recorded in Port Aransas, Texas, and features songs they worked on or recorded together.

Personal life
Canada is married to Shannon Canada, who also manages The Departed and their label Underground Sound. He has two sons, Dierks Cobain Canada (named after personal friend and country singer Dierks Bentley and former Nirvana lead singer Kurt Cobain), and Willy Vedder Canada (named after Reckless Kelly member Willy Braun and Pearl Jam's long time lead singer Eddie Vedder). Dierks plays in a band called Waves, and has been featured in live shows with Cody. He is also the brother in law of fellow red dirt musician Wade Bowen, who married his sister-in-law Shelby. Canada is also a Christian, and has mentioned his faith and Jesus Christ in Ragweed songs Highway 377, Carry You Home (of off 2002's Purple Album), Down (2004's Soul Gravy), and When it All Goes Down (Garage, 2005). He lives in New Braunfels, Texas with his family.

Discography

Studio albums

References

1976 births
American rock singers
American alternative country singers
Living people
People from Pampa, Texas
People from New Braunfels, Texas
Musicians from New Braunfels, Texas
Songwriters from Texas
21st-century American singers